Clyde Earl Smith (July 31, 1897 – May 22, 1971) was a justice of the Supreme Court of Texas from November 15, 1950 to December 31, 1970.

References

Justices of the Texas Supreme Court
1897 births
1971 deaths
20th-century American judges